Sweden sent 24 competitors to compete in all five disciplines at the 2010 Winter Paralympics in Vancouver, British Columbia, Canada.

Medalists
The following Swedish athletes won medals at the games:

Alpine skiing

Biathlon

Cross-country skiing 

Sprint

Ice sledge hockey 

The Swedish ice sledge hockey team qualified by winning the qualifier tournament.

Wheelchair curling 

The Swedish team qualified for the 2010 Paralympic wheelchair curling tournament based on their performance in the 2007, 2008, and 2009 World Wheelchair Curling Championships.

See also
Sweden at the 2010 Winter Olympics

References

External links
Vancouver 2010 Paralympic Games official website
International Paralympic Committee official website

Nations at the 2010 Winter Paralympics
2010
Winter Paralympics